Ryczów  is a village in the administrative district of Gmina Spytkowice, within Wadowice County, Lesser Poland Voivodeship, in southern Poland.

The village was founded in the early 14th century by Cistercian monks from Kraków. A castle was also built in the 14th century, possibly as part of king Casimir III's border defense system. A Catholic parish was founded in 1436. Between 1945–1954 years the village was a seat of a separate gmina. In 1975–1999, it belonged to Bielsko-Biala Voivodeship

Ryczów is geographically subdivided into two parts. The highest point of the village is about 345 m above sea level and the lowest is about 100 m below. Through the village runs the National Road No. 44 (Gliwice-Oświęcim-Skawina-Kraków) and the railway line Kraków-Oświęcim. At the northern end on the bank of the Vistula river lies the hamlet called Chałupki.

Kindergarten, primary school and gymnasium are located in Ryczów.

References

Villages in Wadowice County